Allan Zachariasen (born 4 November 1955 in Odense, Syddanmark) is a retired long-distance runner from Denmark. He competed for his country in the men's marathon at the 1984 Summer Olympics, finishing in 25th place. He set his personal best in the classic distance (2:11.05) in 1983. Zachariasen is a five-time national champion in the men's 5,000 metres. He is the two-time winner of the Twin Cities Marathon, sweeping the first two years of the city-to-city course in the Twin Cities.

Achievements

References

External links
 
 

1955 births
Living people
Danish male long-distance runners
Danish male marathon runners
Olympic athletes of Denmark
Athletes (track and field) at the 1984 Summer Olympics
Sportspeople from Odense